The swamp rabbit (Sylvilagus aquaticus), also called the cane-cutter, is a large cottontail rabbit found in the swamps and wetlands of the southern United States. The species has a strong preference for wet areas, and it will take to the water and swim.

Range and habitat
The swamp rabbit is found in much of the south-central United States and along the Gulf coast. It is most abundant in Alabama, Mississippi, and Louisiana, but also inhabits South Carolina, Tennessee, Texas, Oklahoma, Missouri, Kentucky, Illinois, Indiana, and Georgia. It is possibly extirpated from Kansas.

Swamp rabbits mainly live close to lowland water, often in cypress swamps, marshland, floodplain, and river tributaries. Swamp rabbits spend much of their time in depressions which they dig in tall grass or leaves, providing cover while they wait until the nighttime to forage.

There is concern that swamp rabbits are increasingly becoming exposed to predation, especially during snowy/wintry seasons. Snow cover has shown to increase swamp rabbit mortality by almost two times in the northern extent of their range. This is due mostly to the fact that snow cover constrains hiding ability and availability of food resources.

Physical description
S. aquaticus is the largest of the cottontail species, although its ears are smaller than those of other cottontails. Males are slightly larger than females. The head and back are typically dark or rusty brown or black, while the throat, ventral surface, and tail are white, and there is a cinnamon-colored ring around the eye. Their sides, rump, tail and feet are much more brownish, along with a pinkish-cinnamon eye-ring, as opposed to the whitish eye-ring in eastern cottontails.

Predation
Known predators of Sylvilagus aquaticus are domestic dogs (Canis familiaris), American alligators (Alligator mississippiensis), and humans (Homo sapiens). Even though their swimming abilities lack the speed to escape a pack of hunting dogs, swamp rabbits elude pursuers by lying still in the water surrounded by brush or plant debris with only their nose visible.  The species is hunted for fur, meat, and sport, and is the second-most commonly hunted rabbit in the United States. Swamp rabbits have several adaptations to avoid predators: cryptic coloration, "freezing", and rapid, irregular jumping patterns.

Ontogeny and reproduction
S. aquaticus are synchronous breeders. Females give birth to altricial young. Young are born with well-developed fur but their eyes are closed and they are immobile. Their eyes have opened by day three and the young have begun walking. They are weaned and leave the nest after about 15 days. Young are sexually mature at seven months and reach adult weight at 10 months. The nests in which the young are born consist of a slight depression in the earth that is filled with grasses mixed with rabbit hair.

Breeding season varies widely across the range of S. aquaticus, usually occurring anywhere between February and August, but can occur year-round in Texas. Spermatogenesis has been noted to occur in S. aquaticus in Missouri in October and November. In a Mississippi study, groups of males harvested in December and February had higher percentages of individuals with descended testes than those harvested in any other months (Class 2006). S. aquaticus exhibit induced ovulation and have an hour-long estrus. The gestation period lasts 35 to 40 days. Females can have 1 to 3 litters a year with each litter consisting of 4 to 6 young. The occurrence of embryo resorption has been seen in S. aquaticus; this loss of in-utero litters is attributed to some type of habitat disturbance such as flooding, which may cause overcrowding to occur.

Diet
Swamp rabbits are herbivorous; they eat a variety of foraged plants, including grasses, sedges, shrubs, tree bark  seedlings, and twigs. They feed mainly at night but rain showers will often cause them to feed during daytime as well.  A study has found that the preferred foods of S. aquaticus are savannah panicgrass (Phanopyrum gymnocarpon), false nettle (Boehmeria cylindrica), dewberry (Rubus trivialis) and greenbrier (Smilax bona-nox).

Like other lagomorphs, they have a double digestion.  Food passes through their gut twice, first producing soft, green feces (cecotropes) which still contain nutrients.  These are eaten by the animal (coprophagy), and after further digestion the remains form drier, dark brown or black hard pellets, which are not eaten.

Species competition 
Rival males will often engage in aggressive encounters that sometimes become violent enough to kill one of the combatants. When fighting, males will stand on their hind legs and use their teeth and claws to inflict wounds on their opponent. They will also jump from the ground and strike with the sharp claws of the hind feet.

See also
 Jimmy Carter rabbit incident

References

External links 
 

Fauna of the Southeastern United States
Mammals described in 1837
Sylvilagus
Taxa named by John Bachman